Viswaroopam is 1981 Telugu-language philosophical film, produced by K. Bhanu Prasad under the Kavi Ratna Movies banner and directed by Dasari Narayana Rao. It stars N. T. Rama Rao, Jayasudha and music composed by Chakravarthy. The film was a flop at the box office.

Plot
The film begins in a town, where two venomous Anna Rao (Rao Gopala Rao) & Gunna Rao (Satyanarayana) always compete and conducts mayhem for the Municipal Chairman post. They also motivate their children Prasad Babu (Prasad Babu) & Eeswar Rao (Eeswar Rao) respectively, who conflict in college politics. In that dilemma, a good samaritan Viswam (N. T. Rama Rao) is appointed as a lecturer who eradicates the dirty politics from the college and reforms his students. At the same time, again municipal elections are notified, and Anna Rao & Gunna Rao approach Viswam for his support. Here, Viswam himself contests wins with the highest majority by the boast and aiding of his students. Thereby, Anna Rao & Gunna Rao conspire and slays Viswam. Surprisingly, Viswam's soul appears to Prasad Babu & Eeswar Rao, guides them to find his resemble Chittaiah (again N. T. Rama Rao) a justice-seeking ruffian. At Present, they replace him as Viswam by civilizing which galvanizes Anna Rao & Gunna Rao. Parallelly, their area always has a threat of floods which devastates hundreds of lives. Hence, Chittaiah decides to contract a dam which is the life ambition of Viswam for which the brutal generate several hurdles. During that plight, Chittaiah unites the students, rouses the public, raises the funds, and completes the project. Frustrated, malicious decide to blast the dam when Viswam's soul directs his student and make them protect it. At last, Chittaiah eliminates Anna Rao & Gunna Rao and surrenders to the judiciary. Finally, the movie ends Viswam's soul mingling in the universe.

Cast
N. T. Rama Rao as Viswam & Chittaiah (dual role)
Jayasudha as Chukka
Rao Gopala Rao as Anna Rao
Satyanarayana as Gunna Rao
Allu Ramalingaiah as Lecturer Ramalingaiah
Mikkilineni as Principal
Prasad Babu as Prasad 
Eeswar Rao as Eeswar Rao
Hari Prasad as Hari Prasad
R. Narayana Murthy as Murthy 
Ambika as Mallika
Sukumari as Malathamma
Subhashini as Revathi
Anitha

Soundtrack

Music composed by Chakravarthy. Music released SEA Records Audio Company.

References

External links

Indian drama films
Films directed by Dasari Narayana Rao
Films scored by K. Chakravarthy
1981 drama films
1981 films